Rasaq Tanimowo (born 9 September 1992) is a male Nigerian weightlifter. On 10 September 2015, he won two silver medals in weightlifting while representing Nigeria at the 2015 All-Africa Games in Brazzaville. Prior to the 2015 All-Africa Games, he also represented Nigeria at the 2014 Commonwealth Games in Glasgow, Scotland.

Major competitions

References

1992 births
Living people
People from Lagos State
Nigerian male weightlifters
Weightlifters at the 2014 Commonwealth Games
Commonwealth Games competitors for Nigeria
African Games silver medalists for Nigeria
African Games medalists in weightlifting
Competitors at the 2015 African Games